Narayan Ganesh Gore (Devanagari: नारायण गणेश गोरे) (1907–1 May 1993) was a socialist leader and Marathi writer from Maharashtra, India.

Early life 
He was born in the town of Hindale in Konkan. He received his school and college education in Pune to earn a degree in law.

Career 
Since his college days, Gore participated in India's struggle for independence under Mahatma Gandhi's leadership from the British Raj. In 1942, he suffered imprisonment by the British authorities for his participation in the struggle.

After India's independence in 1947, Gore served as member of 2nd Lok Sabha in 1957–62, the mayor of Pune in 1967–68; as a member of Rajya Sabha in Indian parliament during 1970–76; and as the High Commissioner
 of India to the United Kingdom during 1977–79. He was the president of the Indian socialist party for many years.

From 26 January 1981 to 12 January 1984, Gore served as the editor of the weekly Sadhana (weekly) (साधना).

Literary work
Gore wrote short stories; political and nonpolitical essays; and travelogues. He also translated two important works. In all, he wrote more than 25 books. The following is a partial list of the titles of his books:

Collections of short stories and nonpolitical essays
 Karavande (करवंदे) (1953)
 Seeteche Pohe (सीतेचे पोहे) (1953)
 Dali (डाली) (1956)
 Gulabashi (गुलबशी) (1959)
 Shankh Ani Shimpale (शंख आणि शिंपले) (1964)
 Chinarachya Chhayet (चिनारच्या छायेत) (1969)
 Kahi Pane, Kahi Phule (काही पाने, काही फुले) (1983)
Karavande (करवंदे) is a collection of Gore's letters to his young daughter.
Seeteche Pohe (सीतेचे पोहे) is a collection of Gore's short stories.

Shaap Ani AShaap

Translations
 Jawaharlal Nehru's autobiography, and also its abridged version for children
 Kalidas's Sanskrit poetic work Meghdoot (मेघदूत) (translated in verse form)  (1956)
 Sarvepalli Radhakrishnan's edited work translated as Gandhijinche Wiwidh Darshan (गांधीजींचे विविधदर्शन)

Collections of political essays
 Karagruhachya Bhinti (कारागृहाच्या भिंती) (1942)
 Samajawadach Ka? (समाजवादच का?) (1948)
 Bharatachi Purwa Sarahadda (भारताची पूर्व सरहद्द) (1953)
 Tapu Lagalela Himalay (तापू लागलेला हिमालय) (1953)
 Samrajyashahi Va Wishwa Kutumbawad  (साम्राज्यशाही व विश्वकुटुंबवाद)

References

External links
 http://www.rasik.com/cgi_bin/display_book.cgi?bookId=b49842&lang=marathi

1907 births
1993 deaths
Marathi-language writers
Mayors of Pune
Indian independence activists from Maharashtra
India MPs 1957–1962
Lok Sabha members from Maharashtra
Rajya Sabha members from Maharashtra
High Commissioners of India to the United Kingdom
Indian socialists
20th-century Indian translators
Indian political writers
20th-century Indian essayists
20th-century Indian short story writers
Writers from Pune
Praja Socialist Party politicians